KZZT (105.5 FM) is a radio station broadcasting a classic rock format. Licensed to Moberly, Missouri, United States, the station serves the Columbia, MO area. The station is currently owned by Best Broadcast Group and licensed to FM-105, Inc. and features programming from ABC Radio and some local DJs.

References

External links

ZZT